The 24th Coast Artillery Regiment was  a Coast Artillery regiment in the United States Army. It was the garrison of the Harbor Defenses of Argentia and St. John's, Newfoundland from February 1942 through October 1944, as a battalion after March 1943.

Lineage  
Constituted 13 January 1942 and activated 17 January 1942 at Fort H.G. Wright, New York as 24th Coast Artillery (HD) Regiment (Composite). HHB and Batteries A and B organized at Fort H.G. Wright. Batteries C, D, and E organized 16 February 42 at Fort Pepperrell in Newfoundland Base Command (NBC) with personnel reassigned from Battery A, 53rd Coast Artillery (Tractor Drawn) (TD) Regiment; Battery D, 52nd Coast Artillery (Railway) Regiment; and 2nd Platoon, Battery G, 53rd CA (TD) Regt, that were inactivated in Newfoundland and transferred back to their parent regiments in CONUS, less personnel and equipment. 
 HHB and Batteries A and B were transferred 3 March 1942 to the New York Port of Embarkation for transshipment to Newfoundland, arriving at Fort McAndrew, Newfoundland 25 March 1942.
 Battery F activated 27 June 1942. 
 Reorganized as 24th CA (HD) Battalion (Separate) 23 March 1943; reorganized as 24th CA (HD) Battalion (Composite) 10 April 1943.
 HHB and Battery C transferred to Camp Shanks, New York for inactivation and reassignment of personnel, arriving 2 January 1944. Detachment of 24th CA Battalion transferred to Camp Shelby, Mississippi 4 January 1944, inactivated and personnel reassigned to Army Ground Forces upon arrival 15 January 1944.
 The remainder (HHD, Batteries A, B, D, and F) operated in NBC with detachments at Harmon Field and Fort McAndrew until reorganized October 1944. Battery B inactivated Fort Jackson, SC. HHD, Batteries A, D, and F transferred to Camp Myles Standish, Massachusetts, where the battalion was inactivated and disbanded 8 September 1945.

See also
 Seacoast defense in the United States
 United States Army Coast Artillery Corps
 Harbor Defense Command

References

 
 Gaines, William C., Coast Artillery Organizational History, 1917-1950, Coast Defense Journal, vol. 23, issue 2

External links

 Official US Army lineage website for current units 
 Harbor Defenses in Newfoundland at the Coast Defense Study Group website
 FortWiki, lists most CONUS and Canadian forts
 American Forts Network, lists forts in the US, former US territories, Canada, and Central America

024
Military units and formations established in 1942
1942 establishments in the United States
Military units and formations disestablished in 1945